Henan, a Chinese province on the central plain area, has an expansive network consisting of national-level and provincial level expressways. As of 2017, the province had  of expressways. 99 out of the 109 county-level divisions of Henan has expressway connections.

Numbering
The national-level expressways are numbered with a letter prefix G, which is short for "guojia" in Chinese meaning "national". For provincial-level expressways, a letter prefix S, which is short for "shengji" (province level). The numbering of provincial-level expressways in Henan follows the rules below:
 For radial expressways leaving Zhengzhou (the province capital), use a number in 81–90. (except for S1)
 For north–south expressways, use an odd number in 11–69. (in ascending order from east to west, except for S83)
 For east–west expressways, use an even number in 10–70. (in ascending order from north to south, except for S81 and S86)
 For connection or branch routes, use a number in 91–99.
 Numbers 2-10 are reserved for radial expressways, and 71-80 are reserved for connection routes.

List of routes

National-level expressways

Provincial-level expressways

References

Expressways in Henan
Transport in Henan